The 2007 South Carolina Gamecocks football team represented the University of South Carolina in the Southeastern Conference during the 2007 NCAA Division I FBS football season.  The Gamecocks were led by Steve Spurrier in his third season as USC head coach and played their home games in Williams-Brice Stadium in Columbia, South Carolina.  The team was bowl eligible at 6–6 but was not selected for a bowl game.

Schedule

References

South Carolina
South Carolina Gamecocks football seasons
South Carolina Gamecocks football